Michigamme may refer to the following placenames in the U.S. state of Michigan:

 Lake Michigamme, in Marquette and Baraga Counties
 Michigamme, Michigan, an unincorporated community
 Michigamme Reservoir, a reservoir in Michigan
 Michigamme River, a tributary of the Menominee River
 Michigamme Township, Michigan, in Marquette County